The Glory of Gershwin is a 1994 tribute album by various singers and performers in celebration of American musician Larry Adler's 80th birthday. Adler himself plays the harmonica on each of the songs, all of which are written by Adler's lifelong friends, George and Ira Gershwin, except where collaborators were involved and are indicated.
 
Produced by George Martin, the album peaked for three weeks at second place on the UK Albums Chart. The song "The Man I Love", featuring Kate Bush, was released as a single and reached number 27 in the UK Singles Chart.

Track listing

The US version does not include the tracks by Chris de Burgh and Willard White.

Charts and certifications

Weekly charts

Certifications

References

1994 albums
Albums produced by George Martin
George and Ira Gershwin tribute albums
Mercury Records albums